Macrolepiota procera, the parasol mushroom, is a basidiomycete fungus with a large, prominent fruiting body resembling a parasol. It is a fairly common species on well-drained soils. It is found solitary or in groups and fairy rings in pastures and occasionally in woodland. Globally, it is widespread in temperate regions.

Taxonomy
The fungus was first described in 1772 by Italian naturalist Giovanni Antonio Scopoli, who named it Agaricus procerus. Rolf Singer transferred it to the genus Macrolepiota in 1948.

Description
The height and cap diameter of a mature specimen may both reach 30 to 40 (50) cm. The stipe is relatively thin and reaches full height before the cap has expanded. The stipe is very fibrous in texture which renders it inedible (unless dried and ground). The surface is characteristically wrapped in a snakeskin-like pattern of scaly growths (therefore, known in some parts of Europe as the "snake's hat" or "snake's sponge"). The immature cap is compact and egg-shaped, with the cap margin around the stipe, sealing a chamber inside the cap. As it matures, the margin breaks off, leaving a fleshy, movable ring around the stipe. At full maturity, the cap is more or less flat, with a chocolate-brown umbo in the centre that is leathery to touch. Dark and cap-coloured flakes remain on the upper surface of the cap and can be removed easily. The gills are crowded, free, and white with a pale pink tinge sometimes present. The spore print is white. It has a pleasant nutty smell. When sliced, the white flesh may turn a pale pink.

Uses
Macrolepiota procera is a choice edible mushroom. It is very sought-after and popular in Europe, due in part to its large size, seasonal frequency, and versatility in the kitchen. In the UK, it may be found from July through to November.

The parasol mushroom is difficult to mistake for any other, especially in regions like Europe where the poisonous look-alike Chlorophyllum molybdites is rare. The spores and lamellae of C. molybdites are notably greener in appearance. Nevertheless, as with picking any fungus for consumption, caution should be exercised at all times.

Macrolepiota procera is also edible raw, though its close lookalikes in the genus Chlorophyllum are toxic raw.

These mushrooms are popularly sauteed in melted butter. In central and eastern European countries this mushroom is usually prepared similarly to a cutlet. It is usually run through egg and breadcrumbs and then fried in a pan with some oil or butter. A savory Slovak recipe is to bake caps stuffed with ground pork, oregano, and garlic. Italians and Austrians also serve the young, still spherical caps stuffed with seasoned minced beef, baked in the same manner as stuffed peppers.

While the cap can be eaten any number of ways, the hollow, fibrous stem and the bulb are often discarded. However, they can be dried and ground into mushroom powder for use in eg. soups, stews and sauces.

Similar species

Smaller but similar in appearance is the common shaggy parasol (Chlorophyllum rhacodes). Chlorophyllum rhacodes, and other species in Chlorophyllum section Rhacodium, lacks the aforementioned snakeskin pattern on the stipe, this can help make distinctions between M. procera and Chlorophyllum rhacodes. Its edibility is suspect as it causes mild sickness in some people, especially when eaten raw. One must learn to distinguish the two as their geographical ranges overlap.

Differences from the parasol mushroom include its smaller dimensions, pungent (fruity) and reddening flesh when cut, lack of patterns on its stipe, and very shaggy cap surface.

Macrolepiota mastoidea, a European species, is yet another very large edible mushroom. Its dimensions are generally smaller than that of M. procera and the markings on its stipe less obvious. It is also much rarer.

Species of Agaricus have brown spores and the gills of mature specimens are never white.

There are a few poisonous species which can be mistaken for M. procera. 
Chlorophyllum molybdites, a species that causes the largest number of annual mushroom poisonings in North America due to its close similarity. Faintly green gills and a pale green spore print give it away. Furthermore, this mushroom lacks the aforementioned snakeskin pattern that is generally present on the parasol mushroom. Its range is reportedly expanding into Europe.

Leucocoprinus brunnea, also found in North America, slowly turns brown when sliced.
White and immature species of Amanita are also a potential hazard. To be sure, one must only pick parasol mushrooms past their button stage. A general rule of thumb with the parasol mushroom as compared to amanita species is that the parasol mushroom has darker flakes on a lighter surface, whereas amanita species have the opposite, lighter flakes (if there are any) on a darker surface, such as the Panther cap. This rule of thumb does not apply everywhere like to the species Amanita smithiana.
The Saffron Parasol Cystoderma amianthinum is very much smaller, and not often eaten.
Lepiota brunneoincarnata is a lepiota species known to have caused fatal poisonings in Spain. It is much smaller than Macrolepiota procera.

Gallery

References

External links

Agaricaceae
Edible fungi
Fungi described in 1772
Fungi of Europe
Fungi found in fairy rings
Fungi of Finland
Taxa named by Giovanni Antonio Scopoli